Prostanthera albiflora is a species of flowering plant in the family Lamiaceae and is endemic to inland areas of Western Australia. It is an erect, spreading shrub with narrow egg-shaped to narrow elliptical leaves and two to twelve white flowers with pale blue spots inside and arranged in the upper leaf axils.

Description
Flowering occurs in April or from August to October.

Taxonomy
Prostanthera albiflora was first formally described in 1988 by Barry Conn in the journal Nuytsia from specimens collected between Agnew and Wiluna in 1975.

Distribution and habitat
This mintbush grows along watercourses in the Carnarvon, Gascoyne, Little Sandy Desert, Murchison, Pilbara and Yalgoo biogeographic regions of inland Western Australia.

Conservation status
Prostanthera albiflora is classified as "not threatened" by the Western Australian Government Department of Parks and Wildlife.

References

albiflora
Flora of Western Australia
Lamiales of Australia
Taxa named by Barry John Conn
Plants described in 1988